The Thompson Ministry was the 60th ministry of the Government of Victoria. It was led by the Premier of Victoria, Lindsay Thompson, of the Liberal Party. The ministry was sworn in on 5 June 1981.

Portfolios

References

Victoria (Australia) ministries
Liberal Party of Australia ministries in Victoria (Australia)
Ministries of Elizabeth II
1981 establishments in Australia
1982 establishments in Australia
Cabinets established in 1981
Cabinets disestablished in 1982